Tornodoxa dubicanella is a moth in the family Gelechiidae. It was described by Ueda in 2012. It is found in Japan (Hokkaido, Kyushu).

The length of the forewings is 5-6.5 mm for males and 5-5.5 mm for females. The forewings are whitish, irregularly tinged with pale brownish grey and scattered with fuscous scales. There is a fuscous dot on the costa at the base and a fuscous dot on the subcosta near the base. There is also a narrow, elongate fuscous mark on the median fifth of the costa and an oval pale fuscous suffusion before the middle of the cell. The hindwings are pale ochreous.

References

Chelariini
Moths described in 2012